Kailash Soni (born 4 November 1950) was elected to the Rajya Sabha from Madhya Pradesh on 15 March 2018.

References

Living people
Rajya Sabha members from Madhya Pradesh
Bharatiya Janata Party politicians from Madhya Pradesh
1950 births